John Anderson is a Canadian former water polo player who was a member of the Canada men's national water polo team who appeared in the 1984 Summer Olympics.
2018 - Inducted in to the UCSB Athletics Hall of Fame.

Playing career

Youth and collegiate 
Anderson enrolled at the University of California, Santa Barbara for college and played water polo for the UC Santa Barbara Gauchos.  He played from 1984 through 1985 and was a two-time All American.

Club 
Anderson played with the Harvard Water Polo Foundation and won two national championships.  He later became president and general manager of the club.

International 
Anderson was a member of the Canadian men's national water polo team for 16 years, highlighted by an appearance in the 1984 Summer Olympics in Los Angeles, California.

References 
 
https://www.ucsbgauchos.com/general/2017-18/releases/20180208jdqvmf

External links 
 Canadian Olympic Committee player profile
 Sports Reference player profile

Living people
Canadian male water polo players
Olympic water polo players of Canada
Water polo players at the 1984 Summer Olympics
UC Santa Barbara Gauchos men's water polo players
Year of birth missing (living people)